Louis Chauvin (March 13, 1881March 26, 1908) was an American ragtime pianist and composer.

Early life and education
Born in St. Louis, Missouri, to a Mexican Spanish-Indian father and an African-American mother, he widely was considered the finest pianist in the St. Louis area at the turn of the century. He was part of the ragtime community that met at Tom Turpin's Rosebud bar with Joe Jordan and others.

Career

Chauvin left only three published compositions and died without having recorded, so his ability is hard to judge today. However, he was long remembered by his peers as an exceptionally gifted performer and composer. He primarily is remembered today for "Heliotrope Bouquet", the rag in which he shares compositional credit with Scott Joplin. The nature of the music seems to indicate that Chauvin provided the basis for the first two strains, and Joplin wrote the last two and edited the work into a cohesive piece due to the debilitating effects of Chauvin's illness.

His published works are:
 "The Moon Is Shining in the Skies" (with Sam Patterson, 1903)
 "Babe, It's Too Long Off" (words by Elmer Bowman, 1906)
 "Heliotrope Bouquet" (with Scott Joplin, 1907)

Death
Chauvin died in Chicago at the age of 27; he has been cited as an early member of the "27 Club". His death certificate lists causes of death as "multiple sclerosis, probably syphilitic", and starvation due to coma. However, a modern assessment probably would conclude he had neurosyphilitic sclerosis unrelated to multiple sclerosis. He is buried in Calvary Cemetery in St. Louis, Missouri.

References

Further reading
They All Played Ragtime by Rudi Blesh and Harriet Janis. Knopf, 1950.
Jazz and Death: Medical Profiles of Jazz Greats by Frederick J. Spencer. Mississippi, 2002.

1881 births
1908 deaths
19th-century African-American musicians
19th-century American male musicians
19th-century American pianists
20th-century African-American musicians
20th-century American male musicians
20th-century American pianists
African-American composers
African-American male composers
African-American pianists
American male pianists
Burials at Calvary Cemetery (St. Louis)
Musicians from St. Louis
Ragtime composers
Ragtime pianists